Riki Te Mairiki "Dick" Taiaroa  (1866 – 9 April 1954) was a New Zealand rugby union footballer who was a member of the 1888–89 New Zealand Native football team that toured New Zealand, the British Isles, and Australia. The tour was the longest in rugby history—the team played 107 matches on tour—and Taiaroa played at least 59 matches in the British Isles and 85 in total. This was second in number only to William Elliot who played 86 matches total. Taiaroa also played provincial rugby for Wellington in 1886 and 1887, and Hawke's Bay in 1889. Outside of rugby, he was a surveyor and then farmer. He also served with the New Zealand Contingent of Mounted Rifles during the Anglo-Boer War. Taiaroa was from a prominent Māori family, and was a representative at the coronation of Edward VII and George V. In the 1949 King's Birthday Honours he was appointed an Officer of the Order of the British Empire for services to the Māori people.

Notes

References

Works cited 
 

1860s births
1954 deaths
New Zealand rugby union players
People from Otago Peninsula
Wellington rugby union players
Hawke's Bay rugby union players
New Zealand military personnel of the Second Boer War
New Zealand Officers of the Order of the British Empire
Ngāi Tahu people
New Zealand Māori rugby union players
Ellison family
Māori All Blacks players
Rugby union players from Otago
Rugby union forwards